is a Japanese politician.  He is a former representative in Diet and is a member of the New Komeito Party.  In 1980 he left Kyoto University's graduate school mid-term to work in the Biochemical-Industry Division of Japan's Ministry of Economy, Trade and Industry (METI).  He retired from METI in 2003 and in 2004 was elected to the Diet's Upper House.  In 2006, he became the Ministry of Foreign Affairs's Parliamentary Secretary in the Shinzō Abe cabinet.

He earned his undergraduate degree from Kyoto University in 1979.

External links 
 国政に新風を！浜田昌良

Members of the House of Councillors (Japan)
People from Osaka
Kyoto University alumni
1957 births
Living people
New Komeito politicians